Manly George Barton (born March 14, 1949) is an American politician. He is a member of the Mississippi House of Representatives from the 109th District, being first elected in 2011. He is a member of the Republican party.

References

1949 births
Living people
Republican Party members of the Mississippi House of Representatives
21st-century American politicians